The Challenge: Spies, Lies & Allies is the thirty-seventh season of the MTV reality competition series The Challenge. This season features alumni from The Real World, Are You the One?, Big Brother (Nigeria, UK and U.S.), Ex on the Beach (Netherlands), Survivor (Romania, Spain, Turkey and U.S.), Love Island (Germany, UK and U.S.), Geordie Shore, Warsaw Shore, Paradise Hotel (Sweden), Shipwrecked, The Circle (U.S.), Too Hot to Handle, Ultimate Beastmaster and 12 Dates of Christmas competing for a share at a $1 million prize. The season premiered on August 11, 2021. A launch special titled "The Challenge Spies, Lies and Allies: Global Activation" aired on August 9, 2021. The season aired in 190 different countries, and was the number one unscripted series, for 18-34 year olds, in the 2021-2022 broadcast year.

This season's 12th episode, titled "500", marked the series' 500th episode overall and aired on October 27. This milestone was commemorated by host T. J. Lavin and the remaining cast prior to commencing the episode's challenge.

Contestants

Format
Spies, Lies & Allies features a main challenge, a nomination process, and an elimination round. This season had players competing in male-female teams of two, with each team initially consisting of an American competitor and an international competitor based on participants' respective home country. These teams changed throughout the season due to the format of the game.

Daily Challenge: Players compete in a main challenge in teams of two, where the winning team forms the "Agency" and are immune from elimination. 
Nominations: Players, besides the Agency, participate in nominations and must vote for one team to participate in the elimination round. They are given 20 minutes to discuss the nominations before voting simultaneously and as individuals. The team that receive the most votes are "compromised" and will compete in the elimination round.
The Agency: At the Lair, players in the Agency must vote for one male and one female, regardless of whether or not they are a pair, to compete against the compromised team in the elimination round as a pair. 
Eliminations ("The Lair"): The compromised team compete against the two individuals voted in by the Agency in an elimination round. The winning team remains in the game while the losing team is eliminated.

At the start of the episode 10, pairs were disbanded and contestants formed three teams of six based on the team color they selected during the "Diamond Dash" challenge. The new format of the game is as follows.
Daily Challenge: Players compete in a main challenge in teams (or "cells"), where all members of the winning team form the "Agency" and are immune from elimination.
Nominations: At nominations, players are given 20 minutes to discuss nominations and plead their case to the Agency. The Agency must then individually vote for one player of the designated gender to compete in the elimination round. The player that receives the most votes is "compromised" and will compete in the elimination round. 
Eliminations ("The Lair"): At the Lair, the compromised player is given the chance to call out any non-immune player as their opponent for the elimination round. The winner remains in the game while the loser is eliminated.

At the start of episode 18, the teams were disbanded for the final two eliminations of the season as part of the "Night of Elimination" twist before the Final Challenge.

Twists
Infiltration: Two variations of the infiltration twist occurred throughout the season. For most episodes, elimination round winners may select a new team or partner upon winning.
 In episodes 1-8, the winners of the elimination round may choose to remain as a team, or they can "infiltrate" and select any non-immune player of the opposite gender in an existing team (regardless of their home country) as their new partner. In the event that players in an existing pair are chosen, their two former partners and the two former partners of the elimination winners also form two respective new teams. 
 From episodes 10-16, the winner of the elimination round may choose to remain on their current team or infiltrate and join either of the remaining two teams. If they elect to infiltrate, they must select a player from their desired team to swap positions with.
Night of Elimination: Immediately following the "Rocket Run" elimination, teams were disbanded and players had to vote one male and one female to compete in the Lair. All players, including the previous Agency, were eligible to receive votes. The male and female with the most votes then had to call out an opponent of the same gender for an instant elimination.

Gameplay

Challenge games
Compromised: Each American contestant begins chained to a stack of cinder blocks. To determine the initial teams, each international contestant must race down a path to reach the American contestants, collecting a sledgehammer and key along the way. Once there, they must unlock an available American contestant they wish to partner with before using the sledgehammer to break through the cinder blocks and release a safe. Newly-formed teams must then take the safe to a decoding station and open it to collect a gemstone before crossing the finish line. The first team to cross the finish line wins. 
Winners: Aneesa & Logan

Heli Heist: Played two teams at a time. One team member begins in a speeding car while their partner begins in an overhead helicopter. The team member in the helicopter must throw bags of gems to their partner, who must catch them through the car’s sunroof. Once the car reaches the end of the runway, they must exit the car and cross the finish line. The team that catches the most bags the fastest wins. 
Winners: Esther & Fessy

Sea Cave Recon: Played two teams at a time, teams dive off a 30-foot cliff to collect their first "bomb" capsule in the water below. They must then swim through a sea cave to collect a second bomb, proceed to a WaveRunner, and hold onto the attached bodyboard until they are pulled to a buoy. From the buoy, they must swim to shore and place the bombs on a podium. The team with the fastest time wins.
Winners: Ed & Tori

Undercover Comms: Played in two heats of seven teams, one team member begins suspended underneath a platform. They must pull themselves to three codes and describe them to their partner via walkie-talkie. Their partner must search through rubble for the matching codes and use the corresponding numbers to unlock a box containing a detonator, which they may use to eliminate another team from the challenge. The first team to collect three detonators, or the last team standing, wins their heat. However, the team to achieve this the fastest wins and becomes the Agency.
Winners: Esther & Fessy

Mindfield: Each team member must complete three cumulative obstacles to acquire puzzle pieces, and return to deposit their puzzle piece after each obstacle. At the first obstacle, players must crawl under a net to reach their first puzzle piece. At the second obstacle, players must scale a climbing wall to reach their second puzzle piece. At the third obstacle, players must pull a tyre past a marked line and solve the attached math problem to unlock a safe containing their third puzzle piece. After collecting all six puzzle pieces, the first team to solve the puzzle wins.
Winners: Berna & CT

Turning Agents: Played two teams at a time, teams begin strapped to the roof of a car. As the cars perform donuts, they must find their colored symbols printed on a nearby tank and use the corresponding numbers to unlock a lockbox before detonating a smoke bomb. The team with the fastest time wins.
Winners: Emanuel & Kaycee

Dive Bomb: Played in three heats, teams ride a sea scooter to collect two underwater ropes with puzzle pieces attached. They must then grab a key tied to a nearby yacht and use it to open a chest with their remaining puzzle pieces. Once they collect all 16 puzzle pieces, teams must solve the puzzle and detonate their station. The team with the fastest time wins. 
Winners: CT & Emy

Bombshell Battle: Played in three rounds, teams must retrieve four of their colored "bombs" from the center of a mud pit and return them to their station, alternating team members each time. Once they collect all four bombs, they must retrieve a silver bomb to advance to the next round while the number of silver bombs decrease each round. The team that retrieves the sole silver bomb in the final round wins. 
Winners: Logan & Nany

Diamond Dash: For the first stage, players race to collect a sledgehammer before proceeding to the end of the trail. Upon arrival, they can select one of three assignments to complete: using binoculars to view their code on a sign, finding a box that fits into slots of a wall and scaling the wall to reach their code, or scratching paint off a board to reveal their code. Players must then enter the code to unlock a safe, collect a diamond, and place it in either the Emerald, Ruby or Sapphire station – each of which holds six players. It was then revealed that this would be the teams (or "cells") that players would compete in. For the second stage, newly-formed teams must use their sledgehammers to break cinder blocks and place the rubble in one end of a structure. Once they place enough rubble, the structure would balance out to release a diamond. The first team to cross the finish line with their diamond wins.
Winners: Emerald Cell

Satellite Sabotage: Teams begin on a "satellite" suspended above water. One team member at a time must jump across the satellite’s spokes before leaping off the final spoke to unplug a plug. Meanwhile, the remaining teams attempt to stop them by spraying them with a fire hose. Players are disqualified if they fall off the spokes, or fail to jump when pulling out the plugs. The team that gets the most players the furthest, the fastest, wins. In addition to becoming the Agency, each member of the winning team also received a cash prize of $3,000 each.
Winners: Emerald Cell

Brush Contact: Played in three rounds, with one team playing offense and one team playing defense each round. The male team members of the offense team begin at one end of a field and must transfer as many bags, worth varying denominations, to a safe zone in the middle of the field. The female team members must then transfer the bags from the safe zone to the end zone at the end of the field. Meanwhile, the team playing defense attempt to stop them by stealing the bags and bringing them out of bounds. The team that transfers the most money to the end zone wins. 
Winners: Emerald Cell

Sunken Intelligence: Teams must untie a 150-foot rope tied around a sunken shipwreck. They must then attach the rope to a chest, pull the chest to shore and place the diamond inside on a podium. The team with the fastest time wins. 
Winners: Emerald Cell

Submerged: Inspired by scenes from the then-upcoming film Top Gun: Maverick. Teams begin in an aircraft suspended above water. As the aircraft drops into the water and begins to submerge, teams must exit the aircraft and collect 25 tiles attached to the outside. They must then dive under the wing of the aircraft to view an answer key, swim to shore and replicate the key by placing the tiles on an answer board. There is a 45-minute time limit before teams time-out. The team with the fastest time wins. 
Winners: Sapphire Cell

Boom Raiders: Each team begins at their bunker at different ends of a narrow intersecting trench - each bunker has 10 sticks of dynamite in their detonator. One team member at a time must run through the trench to an opposing team's bunker, collect one stick of their dynamite and return it to their detonator before the next team member goes. The first team to accumulate 20 sticks of dynamite and detonate their opponent's bunkers wins.  
Winners: Sapphire Cell

Million Dollar Heist: Each team is given two duffel bags to transfer $1 million worth of banknotes, weighing over 2,000 pounds in total, from their team vault to an SUV at the end of a path. The first team to transfer all of their banknotes wins. 
Winners: Emerald Cell

Dead Drop: Teams begin on a platform suspended above water. One team member at a time must cross a beam and collect one of their team’s ten capsules at the opposite end before returning it to their team’s chest. Meanwhile, members from both opposing teams attempt to knock them off by swinging "bombs" at them from a nearby platform. If a player gets knocked off the beam while holding a capsule, the capsule is considered out of play. The team that transfers the most capsules the fastest wins. 
Winners: Sapphire Cell

Lair games
Back Me Up: Both teams begin strapped together by their backs in the center of a platform. The first team to drag or push their opponents down their respective ramp of the platform wins. 
Played by: Corey L. & Michele vs. Michaela & Renan

Flipping Agents: One team member begins strapped to a cage. Their partner must flip the cage back and forth so they can collect 12 cubic puzzle pieces using a magnet attached to a rope. Once they collect all 12 puzzle pieces, teams must solve the puzzle to reveal a world map. The first team to solve the puzzle wins.
Played by: Ed & Emy vs. Kelz & Tracy

Slipping Up: Players must place each of their provided poles on pegs of a metal frame to form a ladder. They must then climb the ladder and ring the bell at the top. The first player to ring their bell wins. 
Played by: Berna vs. Tacha

Down to the Wire: Each team begins handcuffed to a pole attached to an obstacle course. They must maneuver the pole through the course to collect a key before returning to the start and unlocking themselves. The first team to unlock themselves and pull the lever wins. 
Played by: Amber & Hughie vs. Corey L. & Michele

Higher Assets: Players must climb a 20-foot rope to reach an answer key. They must memorise the answer key before returning down to replicate the key by placing tiles on a memory board. The first player to correctly replicate the answer key wins. 
Played by: Gabo vs. Logan 

Rage Cage: Players must run through a narrow hallway, past their opponent and climb up the end of the hall to ring a bell. The first player to ring their bell twice wins. 
Played by: Emy vs. Esther

Race to Escape: Teams begin tied together by their wrists, facing back-to-back.  They must release themselves by climbing up a 30-foot pole to reach a blade and cutting the ropes that bind them together. The first team to cut both of their ropes wins. 
Played by: Berna & Hughie vs. Jeremiah & Priscilla

Hang in the Balance: Teams begin harnessed on a platform and must transfer all of their puzzle pieces across an angled balance beam to their puzzle station, with both team members crossing simultaneously. Teams must return to the start of the beam if they fall off. Once they transfer all their puzzle pieces, the first team to assemble the vertical puzzle wins.
Played by: Amber & Jeremiah vs. Bettina & Cory

Seek and Destroy: Players must search through piles of sand to find eight colored tyres. They must then memorise a sequence of flashing colored lights and replicate the sequence by placing the tyres around a pole. The first player to correctly replicate the sequence wins.
Played by: Ashley vs. Priscilla

Pole Wrestle: Players begin at the center of the Lair with both hands on a metal pole. The first player to wrestle the pole out of their opponent's hands twice wins
Played by: Ed vs. Kyle

Bombs Away: Players must use a rope to swing an overhead missile at five targets. The first player to hit all five targets wins. 
Played by: Bettina vs. Emy

Rope Burn: Players begin on a spherical cage across from their opponent, with an ignited rope in between them. They must pull their opponent off the cage, or pull the rope out of their opponent's hands to earn a point. The first player to score two points wins. 
Played by: Cory vs. Logan

Vault Escape: Players must pull out cylindrical locks from a 20-foot vault by rotating the lock so that it fits through a narrow hole. They must then climb onto the lock and pull out the next lock, continuing this process for all eight locks. The first player to pull out all eight locks and ring the bell at the top of the vault wins.
Played by: Amanda vs. Big T

Burning Bridges: Players must jump off a platform and ring a hanging bell before collecting a plank. They must then climb back on the platform and place the plank on the frame of a bridge, repeating this process for all 16 planks. If they miss the bell, they must climb and jump again. The first player to place all 16 planks on their bridge and pull the lever at the end wins.  
Played by: Josh vs. Kyle

License to Chill: Players swim through an icy pool and ring a bell at the end before exiting the pool and solving a geometric puzzle. Periodically, host T.J. Lavin would sound an airhorn meaning players must re-enter the pool and ring the bell again before they can continue solving the puzzle. The first player to solve the puzzle wins. 
Played by: Big T vs. Emy

Rocket Run: Players have 15 seconds to run across the Lair, jumping over a rocket along the way, and pull a lever at the end before returning to the start. Players repeat this process until one player is unable to complete this within the allotted time. After an extended period, the time-limit is reduced to 10 seconds. The last player standing wins.
Played by: Emanuel vs. Logan

Drone Drop: Players begin at a podium on opposite ends of the Lair. A drone will drop a football-shaped "package" into  the center of the Lair, which players must retrieve and place on their podium to score a point. The first player to score two points wins.
Played by: Amanda vs. Tori

Triple Threat:  Each player has three puzzles which they must solve in order. The first player to solve all three puzzles wins.
Played by: Devin vs. Emanuel

Final Challenge

Day one
Contestants began the Final Challenge as individuals for the first three checkpoints, changed to a two-team format for the next four checkpoints and finished as pairs. The winning pair were awarded the decision of how much, if any, of the $1 million prize money to award the remaining finalists and how much money to keep for themselves.

Checkpoint #1: Players must assemble a cubic puzzle of a world map before placing ten national flag icons on the country which they represent. Players then race to board one of four helicopters which would fly them to a drop zone above a lake. Each helicopter holds two players and depart in the order that they completed the puzzle.

Checkpoint #2: Players jump from the helicopter into the lake, swim towards a sea scooter and ride it to shore. Along the way, they must also collect a puzzle piece tied to a buoy. After reaching the shore, players then run down a rocky and undulating path to the next checkpoint.

Checkpoint #3: Players arrive at a puzzle station to find 15 puzzle pieces in addition to the piece they collected during the previous checkpoint. They must use the 16 pieces to solve a puzzle before proceeding down a trail. Upon completion, players could then choose to join either the Orange or Purple Cell, each of which hold two male and two female players. Players would then compete in these teams until further notice.

Checkpoint #4: Teams unravel ropes and chains to release a cage and collect the safe inside. They must then dive into a lake and memorize a code submerged underwater before transporting their safe up a mountain. There, teams must find nearby signs and decode the code they memorised to unlock the safe, retrieve the key inside and proceed to the next checkpoint.

Checkpoint #5: Teams use their key from the previous checkpoint to unlock a large cylindrical "missile" and carry it up a winding path to a puzzle. There, they must combine their missile with 11 other missiles to form a matchstick puzzle which they must solve before proceeding to the next checkpoint.  

Checkpoint #6 and Overnight Stage: Teams must roll a large metal sphere containing supplies for the Overnight Stage down a path towards a cave. The first team to reach the cave are safe while the four members of the losing team must compete in an Instant Elimination the following day. Teams then spend the night in the cave with the provided supplies.
Winners: Purple Cell

Day two
Checkpoint #7 - Instant Elimination ("Back Me Up"): Players from the losing team compete against their teammate of the same gender in an Instant Elimination. In a revisit of the season’s first elimination, players begin strapped together by their backs in the center of a platform. The first player to drag or push their opponent down their respective ramp of the platform twice wins while the losers are eliminated.
Played by: Kyle vs. Nelson, Kaycee vs. Nany
Eliminated: Nelson (4th place), Nany (4th place)

Final leg: Teams are disbanded and contestants complete the Final Leg in male-female pairs. The winners of the instant elimination are rewarded with the ability to select any player of the opposite gender as their partner.  The remaining two unselected players form the final pair. Pairs must race to the top of a mountain to find and memorize a 20-digit code. They must then proceed to a safe, enter the code to unlock the safe and retrieve the black diamond inside. The first pair to open their safe are declared the winners of Spies, Lies & Allies and are granted the decision of how much, if any, of the $1 million prize money to award the remaining finalists and how much money to keep for themselves.
Winners: CT & Kaycee – $800,000 retained ($400,000 each)
Runners-up: Kyle & Tori – $100,000 awarded ($50,000 each)
Third place: Devin & Emy – $100,000 awarded ($50,000 each)

Game summary

Elimination progress

Competition
 The contestant finished the final challenge and won
 The contestant finished the final challenge and lost
 The contestant did not finish the final challenge
 The contestant won the daily challenge, was part of the Agency and was immune from elimination
 The contestant was not selected for the Lair
 The contestant was nominated for the Lair, but did not have to compete
 The contestant was voted into the Lair and won
 The contestant lost in the Lair and was eliminated
 The contestant was removed from the competition due to disciplinary reasons
 The contestant was removed from the competition due to medical reasons
 The contestant was removed from the competition for undisclosed reasons

Team progress
Episodes 1-9: Male-Female Pairs
During the opening "Compromised" challenge, the international contestants had to select their initial partner of the opposite gender from the American contestants. They were not given time to meet the American contestants beforehand and had to decide based only on dossiers provided during the previous night, and their prior knowledge. These pairs changed frequently due to the infiltration twist and pairs were not beholden to the American/International format. Pairs were disbanded at the start of the 10th episode.
Episodes 10-17: 3 Teams (Emerald, Ruby, and Sapphire)
The 18 remaining contestants were divided into three teams (called "cells") of six based on the team color they selected during the first stage of the "Diamond Dash" challenge. Teams were disbanded at the start of the 18th episode.

 Teams at the start of each episode

Voting progress

Bold indicates the player was voted in by the Agency

Episodes

Reunion special
The Reunion special aired on December 22, 2021 and was hosted by entertainment personality Maria Menounos. Cast members attended in Amsterdam, Netherlands.

Notes

References

External links
 

2021 American television seasons
Spies Lies and Allies, The Challenge
Television shows set in Croatia
Television shows filmed in Croatia